Joel Fearon (born 11 October 1988) is a British sprinter and bobsledder. He represents the Birchfield Harriers and he is recognisable in the National Trials for wearing a black vest and lycra shorts.  His coach is Michael Khmel, who also coached British Sprinter Craig Pickering. His personal best for the 100m, 9.96 seconds, places him 5th on the UK all-time list.

In addition to pursuing a sprinting career, Fearon has also competed in bobsleigh since November 2011, and was part of the Great Britain crews that finished fifth in the four man event at the FIBT World Championships in February 2013, and second at the Bobsleigh European Championship in January 2014. His team originally finished fifth in the Sochi Winter Olympics, but were subsequently upgraded to bronze medal position after two Russian crews were disqualified for doping violations.

In October 2019, it was reported that Fearon would compete for Switzerland during the 2019-2020 bobsled season on a year long "loan".  He would go on to win a bronze medal at the Europe Cup in Königssee, Germany in December 2019.

In June 2021, Following an anti-doping violation by Russia's Alexander Kasjanov, Fearon's quartet was upgraded to bronze medallists from the World Cup race in Lake Placid in January 2016.

References

English male sprinters
Living people
English male bobsledders
Bobsledders at the 2014 Winter Olympics
Bobsledders at the 2018 Winter Olympics
Olympic bobsledders of Great Britain
Olympic bronze medallists for Great Britain
Olympic medalists in bobsleigh
Sportspeople from Coventry
1988 births